Hydrangea serratifolia is a species of flowering plant in the family Hydrangeaceae. It is native to Chile and Argentina.

References

serratifolia
Flora of Chile
Flora of Argentina